The 1993 International Rostrum of Composers was the 39th edition of the forum. Finnish composer Kimmo Hakola won the UNESCO Mozart Medal with Capriole, a 1991 composition for cello and bass clarinet.

Recommended Works
  Jorge Antunes - Idiosynchronie
  Jean-Luc Fafchamps - Attrition
  Kimmo Hakola - Capriole
  Alfred Janson - Tarantella
  Gisle Kverndokk - Initiation
  Philippe Manoury - La Nuit du Sortilege
  Gerard Pésson - Le Gel par Jeu
  Uroš Rojko - Atemaj
  Mark-Anthony Turnage - Kai
  Ezequiel Viñao - La Noche de las Noches
  Herbert Willi - Concerto for Orchestra

Under-30 Category
  Pietro Borradori - String Quartet
  Gisle Kverndokk - Initiation
  Luca Tessadrelli - St. Lucie's Day

References
 International Music Council

International Rostrum of Composers